A reflector, in cryptology, is a component of some rotor cipher machines, such as the Enigma machine, that sends electrical impulses that have reached it from the machine's rotors, back in reverse order through those rotors. The reflector simplified using the same machine setup for encryption and decryption, but it creates a weakness in the encryption: with a reflector the encrypted version of a given letter can never be that letter itself. That limitation aided World War II code breakers in cracking Enigma encryption. The comparable WW II U.S. cipher machine, SIGABA, did not include a reflector.

Other names 
The reflector is also known as the reversing drum or, from the German, the Umkehrwalze or UKW.

Rotor machines